Angélica del Rosario Araujo Lara (born June 21, 1964) is a Mexican  architect and politician, who served as the Senator for Yucatán. Previously, she was the municipal president of Mérida, Yucatán. She is a member of the Institutional Revolutionary Party.

Early life and career
Angélica Araujo was born on July 21, 1964, in Tixkokob, Yucatán, the daughter of Humberto Araujo Hernández and María del Rosario Lara Báez.

Araujo studied architecture at the Universidad Autónoma de Yucatán. She began her professional activities in the Comisión Ordenadora del Uso del Suelo del Estado de Yucatán and then started her own architectural practice.

Political career
In 2007, the governor of Yucatán, Ivonne Ortega appointed Araujo as managing director of the Instituto de Vivienda del Estado de Yucatán, position she held until 2009, when she resigned to be nominated candidate to federal deputy by Third Federal Electoral District of Yucatán, in which she was elected to the period 2009 - 2012 in the LXI Legislature of the Congress of the Union.

On December 16, 2010, Yucatán's PRI announced her nomination as candidate of unity for the Municipal president of Mérida, Yucatán; thus, on January 6, 2010, she asked and obtained a leave as member of the Chamber of Deputies.  On May 21, 2010, Araujo received the document that appointed her as winner in the elections; she took office on July 1. She became the first female member of the Institutional Revolutionary Party to rule the city. With her election, she ended 19 years of government of National Action Party in Mérida.

In September 2010, Araujo and the governor Ivonne Ortega, led "Tócate", a campaign against breast cancer.

On January 19, 2012, after 18 months as mayor of Mérida, Araujo left office to register as candidate for a seat in the Senate of the Republic in the  following federal election on July 1, 2012. She won election and served as a Senator until her defeat in the 2018 elections.

References

External links 
 Angélica Araujo Lara en la página oficial de la Cámara de Diputados (Araujo's Homepage in the Mexican Congress)

Women members of the Chamber of Deputies (Mexico)
Municipal presidents of Mérida
Members of the Chamber of Deputies (Mexico) for Yucatán
Living people
1964 births
21st-century Mexican politicians
21st-century Mexican women politicians
Universidad Autónoma de Yucatán alumni
Anahuac Mayab University alumni
Mexican architects
Mexican women architects
Deputies of the LXI Legislature of Mexico
Members of the Senate of the Republic (Mexico) for Yucatán
Women members of the Senate of the Republic (Mexico)